Presidential elections were held in Slovenia on 8 April 1990, with a second round on 22 April. Voters elected the four members of the presidency and the President of the presidency. Ciril Zlobec, Ivan Oman, Matjaž Kmecl and Dušan Plut were elected to the presidency, whilst Milan Kučan was elected President in the second round.

Electoral system
The four members of the presidency were elected by plurality-at-large voting, with voters able to vote for four candidates. The four candidates with the most votes were elected.

Results

President

Presidency

References

Slovenia
Presidential elections in Slovenia
1990 in Slovenia
April 1990 events in Europe
Slovenian Spring